Andrew Mwangura is a negotiator between pirates and ship owners off the coast of Africa. He directs the Seafarers' Assistance Programme.

Samuel L. Jackson's Uppity Films along with H2O Motion Pictures are in talks with Mwangura to secure the rights to his life story.

References

Living people
Year of birth missing (living people)
People involved in anti-piracy efforts
Somalian people